Greatest Hits is the first greatest hits album released by New Zealand-born singer Mark Williams, released in late 1977 following the expiry of his contract with EMI Music. It includes tracks from his three studio albums to date; Mark Williams, Sweet Trials and Taking It All In Stride.

Track listing
LP/Cassette (HSD 1064)

References

External links

1977 greatest hits albums
EMI Records albums
Mark Williams (singer) albums